Mixtapes was an American pop punk band from Cincinnati, Ohio signed to No Sleep Records. The band released multiple studio albums before entering an indefinite hiatus in 2013.

History
Mixtapes was formed in the year 2010 by friends Ryan Rockwell and Maura Weaver. They released their first album in 2010 under Death to False Hope Records, titled Maps (album). The following year, they re-released their first album as Maps & Companions on vinyl under Animal Style Records, which featured 5 new songs from a newly recorded EP titled Companions (EP). 

In 2012, the band signed to No Sleep Records and released their second album, titled Even on the Worst Nights. 

On January 6, 2013, Michael Remley announced he would play his last show on February 5 and was soon replaced by Paul Kupper. Later that same year in May, they embarked on a tour with Masked Intruder in support of the album, called the "Let's Talk Industry Tour". In the summer of 2013, Mixtapes played on the annual Warped Tour. The band released their third album in 2013, titled Ordinary Silence. After the release, they went on a fall tour with Real Friends, Forever Came Calling, and Pentimento. 

In the spring of 2014, Mixtapes supported Bayside on their spring headlining tour. In the summer of 2014, the band once again partook in the Warped Tour. Mixtapes played their final two sets at The Fest 13 on Oct. 31 and Nov. 1, 2014 before going on hiatus.

Band members

Final lineup
Ryan Rockwell – vocals, guitar (2010-2014)
Maura Weaver – vocals, guitar (2010-2014)
Paul "Golden Boy" Kupper – bass (2013-2014)
Boone Haley – drums (2010-2014)

Former members 
Michael Remley – bass (2010-2013)

Discography
Albums
Maps (2010)
Even on the Worst Nights (2012)
Ordinary Silence (2013)

EPs
Thought About Growing Up (2010)
A Short Collection of Short Songs (2010)
Castle Songs (2011)
Hope Is for People (2011)
Companions (2011)
How to Throw a Successful Party (2011)
Somewhere in Trinsic (2012)

Splits
Mixtapes/Direct Hit! (2010)
Vision Quest (Mixtapes/Broadway Calls, 2012)
Mixtapes/Jabber (2015)

Compilation release
These Are Us: Unreleased Songs, B Sides, Rarities, Covers, Splits, and Everything Else (2015)

Other songs
2010 - "Broken Hearted Christmas" on the compilation CD It's a Mess X-mas! (Messy Life Records)
2012 - "Right Where to Find Me" on the compilation CD The Thing That Ate Larry Livermore (Adeline Records)
2012 - "Coffee Party" on the compilation CD No Sleep Records Summer 2012 (No Sleep Records)
2015 - "A Million Bad Bands" on These Are Us compilation (Paper and Plastic)
2015 - "Grenadine" on These Are Us compilation (Paper and Plastic)
2015 - "Sleepless in St. Paul (Acoustic/Redux) (Rivethead Cover)" on These Are Us compilation (Paper and Plastic)
2015 - "My, You Look Ravishing Tonight! (Kleenex Girl Wonder Cover)" on These Are Us compilation (Paper and Plastic)
2015 - "Road Maps, Ice Caps, Death Traps" on These Are Us compilation (Paper and Plastic)

Music videos
2010 - "Sprinkles"
2010 - "Werewolf Shame (Direct Hit! Cover)"
2011 - "Hope is For People"
2012 - "I Accept That"
2012 - "Anyways"
2013 - "Bad Parts"

References

Musical groups from Cincinnati
No Sleep Records artists